José Flores may refer to:

 Jose Flores (baseball coach) (born 1971), Puerto Rican baseball coach
 Jose Flores (infielder) (born 1973), American baseball player
 Jose Flores (jockey) (1960–2018), Peruvian-American jockey
 José Flores (Venezuelan footballer)
 José Flores (weightlifter) (born 1930), Dutch Antillean weightlifter
 José Felipe Flores (1751–1824), physician and medicine teaching pioneer in Central America
 José María Flores (1818–1866), officer in the Mexican Army
 José Oscar Flores (born 1971), Argentine footballer